Fern Hill railway station on the Daylesford railway line in Victoria, Australia was opened on Monday, 16 February 1880, and closed on Monday, 3 July 1978.

Very little remains of the former Fern Hill Station. The former station building was burnt down and most of the area is overgrown. A row of cypress trees marks the road off James Lane leading to the station site, and the platform remains can still be seen.

By 1969, the platform was 72.5m in length, and by 1975, a crane still existed at the station.

References

Disused railway stations in Victoria (Australia)